The 1999 NCAA Division II women's basketball tournament was the 18th annual tournament hosted by the NCAA to determine the national champion of Division II women's  collegiate basketball in the United States.

Two-time defending champions North Dakota defeated Arkansas Tech in the championship game, 80–63, to claim the Fighting Sioux's third consecutive and third overall NCAA Division II national title.

The championship rounds were contested in Pine Bluff, Arkansas.

Three teams made their first appearances in the NCAA Division II tournament: Binghamton, Lander, and Western Washington.

Regionals

East - Indiana, Pennsylvania
Location: Memorial Field House Host: Indiana University of Pennsylvania

Great Lakes - Highland Heights, Kentucky
Location: Regents Hall Host: Northern Kentucky University

North Central - Grand Forks, North Dakota
Location: Hyslop Sports Center Host: University of North Dakota

Northeast - Waltham, Massachusetts
Location: Dana Center Host: Bentley College

South - Fort Valley, Georgia
Location: George Woodward Gymnasium Host: Fort Valley State University

South Atlantic - Florence, South Carolina
Location: Smith University Center Host: Francis Marion University

South Central - Emporia, Kansas
Location: White Auditorium Host: Emporia State University

West - Davis, California
Location: Recreation Hall Host: University of California, Davis

Elite Eight - Pine Bluff, Arkansas
Location: Pine Bluff Convention Center Host: University of Arkansas at Pine Bluff

All-tournament team
 Jenny Crouse, North Dakota
 Katie Richards, North Dakota
 Jamie Pudenz, North Dakota
 Khelli Mullen, Arkansas Tech
 Jurgita Kausaite, Emporia State

See also
 1999 NCAA Division II men's basketball tournament
 1999 NCAA Division I women's basketball tournament
 1999 NCAA Division III women's basketball tournament
 1999 NAIA Division I women's basketball tournament
 1999 NAIA Division II women's basketball tournament

References
 1999 NCAA Division II women's basketball tournament jonfmorse.com

 
NCAA Division II women's basketball tournament
1999 in sports in Arkansas